This is a list of events related to British television in 1935.

Events

11 September – Final transmission of John Logie Baird’s 30-line television system by the BBC. The BBC begins preparations for a regular high definition broadcasting service from the Alexandra Palace.

Births
 24 January – Bamber Gascoigne, television host and author (died 2022)
 17 February – Christina Pickles, actress
 21 February – Mark McManus, Scottish actor (died 1994)
 13 March – David Nobbs, comic screenwriter (died 2015)
 23 March – Barry Cryer, comedy writer and performer (died 2022)
 24 March – Mary Berry, television presenter, chef and food writer 
 28 March – Michael Parkinson, journalist and television presenter
 19 April – Dudley Moore, actor, comedian and musician (died 2002)
 1 May – Ian Curteis, English director and playwright (died 2021)
 10 May – Terrance Dicks, television writer (died 2019)
 17 May – Dennis Potter, writer (died 1994)
 26 May – Sheila Steafel, actress (died 2019)
 28 May – Anne Reid, actress
 2 June – Roger Brierley, actor (died 2005)
 16 June – James Bolam, actor
 19 June – Derren Nesbitt, actor
 28 June – John Inman, actor (died 2007)
 9 July – Michael Williams, actor (died 2001)
 12 July – Roy Barraclough, comic actor (died 2017)
 15 July – William G. Stewart, television producer and presenter (died 2017) 
 20 July – Ted Rogers, comedian and light entertainer (died 2001)
 21 July – Julian Pettifer, television journalist
 28 July – Simon Dee, television presenter (died 2009)
 13 August – Rod Hull, entertainer (died 1999)
 5 September – Johnny Briggs, actor (died 2021)
 14 September – Amanda Barrie, actress
 27 November – Verity Lambert, television producer (died 2007)

See also
 1935 in British music
 1935 in the United Kingdom
 List of British films of 1935

References